Griffith Henry Thomson (6 October 1906 – 21 May 1943) was an Australian rules footballer who played with Carlton in the Victorian Football League (VFL).

Family 
The son of Rasmus Thomson (1861–1945) and Jessie Thomson (1873–938), née Thomas, he was born on 6 October 1906.

Military service 
He volunteered for service soon after Australia's declaration of war against Germany, and was moved to Batavia. While  posted there with the Royal Australian Army Pay Corps, he was captured in 1942 as the Japanese army moved south.

He was put to work on the Burma-Siam Railway, and died while working on the railway in May 1943.

He was later buried at Thanbyuzayat War Cemetery.

See also
 List of Victorian Football League players who died in active service

Notes

References 

 Second World War Nominal Roll: Sergeant Griffith Henry Thomson (VX6020), Department of Veterans' Affairs.
 Second World War Service Record: Sergeant Griffith Henry Thomson (VX6020), National Archives of Australia.
 Roll of Honour: Sergeant Griffith Henry Thomson (VX6020), Australian War Memorial.
 Personal Circular: Sergeant Griffith Henry Thomson (VX6020), collection of the Australian War Memorial.
 Sergeant Griffith Henry Thomson (VX6020), Commonwealth War Graves Commission.

External links 
 
 
 Henry Thomson's profile at Blueseum

1906 births
1943 deaths
Carlton Football Club players
Australian rules footballers from Victoria (Australia)
Ararat Football Club players
Australian military personnel killed in World War II
Burma Railway prisoners
Australian Army personnel of World War II
Australian Army soldiers
World War II prisoners of war held by Japan